In mathematics, the Kuratowski–Ulam theorem, introduced by , called also the Fubini theorem for category, is an analog of Fubini's theorem for arbitrary second countable Baire spaces.

Let X and Y be second countable Baire spaces (or, in particular, Polish spaces), and let . Then the following are equivalent if A has the Baire property:
 A is meager (respectively comeager).
 The set  is comeager in X, where , where  is the projection onto Y.
Even if A does not have the Baire property, 2. follows from 1.
Note that the theorem still holds (perhaps vacuously) for X an arbitrary Hausdorff space and Y a Hausdorff space with countable π-base.

The theorem is analogous to the regular Fubini's theorem for the case where the considered function is a characteristic function of a subset in a product space, with the usual correspondences, namely, meagre set with a set of measure zero, comeagre set with one of full measure, and a set with the Baire property with a measurable set.

References

General topology
Descriptive set theory
Theorems in topology